Crane Carrier Company (often abbreviated CCC) is a manufacturer that specializes in construction truck and garbage truck chassis. Located in New Philadelphia, Ohio, it was established by Robert Zeligson in 1946, along with the affiliated Zeligson Trucks. 

The primary design of CCC's trucks are Cab-Beside-Engine (CBE) or half-cabs, most notably the Century II Unimixer. Half-cabs have the advantage of being able to carry the booms of cranes, hence the name of the company.

History
CCC began as a firm that remanufactured World War II-era surplus vehicles for civilian crane-carrying use. In 1953 CCC presented their first own truck, and soon evolved into a company that manufactured over-the-road trucks for concrete mixing, logging, mining, and other construction industries, including a wheeled loader. CCC also builds trucks for oil drilling, water well drilling, terminal tractors, and aviation fuelers. As with most American specialty truck manufacturers, the customer's choice of proprietary engines and transmissions have been available.

Though primarily building CBEs, CCC started moving toward the two-seater market during the 1970s, with models such as the Centaur. The Centurion is a series of low-entry trucks, primarily used for garbage collection. The Centurion has an engine mounted behind the cab and was also available with dual controls.

CCC manufactured Type D school bus chassis during the early to mid-1990s, which were used by bus manufacturers Carpenter Body Company and Wayne Corporation.

CCC sold Zeligson in 1980. It lasted as a separate company for nine years. In 2008, CCC and its parent, CCI Corp., were sold to Glenview, Illinois-based Illinois Tool Works, which stated its plans to continue operating CCC as a separate company.

Crane Carrier Company (CCC) was acquired by Hines Corporation in June 2013 and the company’s headquarters was relocated to New Philadelphia, Ohio. Under Hines, a strategic merger was initiated to join CCC and Kimble Manufacturing forming Hines Specialty Vehicle Group – manufacturer of custom heavy-duty chassis and purpose built vehicles for the refuse and recycling, infrastructure maintenance, ground support, agriculture, oil and gas, and concrete mixer markets.

Crane Carrier Company (CCC) embarked on a new chapter by launching as an independent company in 2019. Headquartered in New Philadelphia, Ohio, CCC consists of two brands, Crane Carrier Company (truck chassis) and Crane Carrier Company Engineered Chassis. The Company was sold to Turnspire Capital Partners in 2019.
Battle Motors a developer of electric vehicles, acquired Crane Carrier in April 2021.

Resources

The Complete Book of Trucks & Tractors, by John Carroll & Peter Davies.
American Truck & Bus Spotter's Guide; 1920–1985, by Tad Burness.

External links

CCC Official Site (JavaScript Required)
Martin Phippard Photograph (Hank's Truck Pictures)
CCC (Internet Movie Cars Database)

Construction equipment manufacturers of the United States
Truck manufacturers of the United States
Manufacturing companies based in Oklahoma
Companies based in Tulsa, Oklahoma
American companies established in 1946
Vehicle manufacturing companies established in 1946
1946 establishments in Oklahoma